Caborn is an unincorporated community in Marrs Township, Posey County, in the U.S. state of Indiana.

History
Caborn was laid out in 1871 by Cornelius Caborn, and named for him. A post office was established at Caborn in 1876, and remained in operation until 1911.

Geography

References

Unincorporated communities in Posey County, Indiana
Unincorporated communities in Indiana